This is a list of New York City newspapers and magazines.

Largest newspapers by circulation
Total circulation, as of March, 2013:
 The Wall Street Journal (2,834,000 daily)
 The New York Times (571,500 daily; 1,087,500 Sunday)
 New York Daily News (200,000 daily; 260,000 Sunday)
 New York Post (230,634 daily)
 Newsday (437,000 daily; 495,000 Sunday)

Newspapers
In March 2023, The New Yorker reported 116 neighborhood newspapers. 
Several other newspapers serve the northern and western suburbs and Long Island.
Akhon Samoy (Bengali weekly)
AM New York Metro (free daily)
Barron's (weekly)Bay Currents (bi-weekly)The Bronx Beat The Bronx Chronicle, a century-old newspaperBronx NewsBronx Press-ReviewBronx Times-ReporterBrooklyn Eagle (daily)Catholic Worker (monthly)Chelsea-Clinton News (weekly)The Chief (public service weekly)City & State (public service bi-weekly)Columbia Daily Spectator (weekly)Crain's New York Business (weekly)Der Blatt (Yiddish-language weekly)Der Yid (Yiddish-language weekly)Duo Wei Times (Chinese-language)El Diario La Prensa (Spanish-language daily)Empire State News (daily)The Epoch Times (daily)Filipino Reporter (weekly)Five Towns Jewish Times (weekly)The Fordham Observer (bi-weekly)Forṿerṭs (Yiddish; weekly, formerly daily)The Fordham Ram (bi-weekly)Gay City News (now stylized as gcn) (weekly)Gotham Gazette (daily)Haitian Times (weekly)Hamodia (daily)The Indypendent (monthly)The Irish Echo (weekly)The Forward, formerly The Jewish Daily Forward (weekly)Jewish Post of New York (weekly)The Jewish Press (weekly)The Jewish Week (weekly)Kanzhongguo (Chinese language weekly)The Korea Times (daily)Long Island Press (monthly) The Main Street WIRE (bi-weekly)Metro New York (free daily)Mott Haven Herald New York Amsterdam News (weekly)New York Daily News (daily)New York Law Journal (weekly)The New York Observer (weekly)New York Post (daily)The New York Times (daily)Newsday (daily)Norwood News (bi-weekly)Nowy Dziennik (Polish-language daily)Queens Chronicle (weekly)Queens Teens Voices (quarterly)Queens Tribune (weekly)Riverdale Press (weekly)Riverdale Review Show Business Weekly (weekly)Shukan NY Seikatsu (Japanese-language weekly)Sing Tao Daily (Chinese-language daily)Staten Island Advance (daily)Street News (every six weeks)Super Express USA (daily)The Tribeca Trib (monthly)Urdu Times (weekly)The Villager (weekly)The Wall Street Journal (daily)Washington Square News (daily)The Wave of Long Island (weekly)The Westsider (weekly) World Journal (Chinese-language daily)

Defunct newspapersAl-Hoda (Arabic-language daily)The Bronx Home NewsThe Brooklyn BaronBrooklyn Times-UnionThe City Sun (weekly)Colored American (weekly)Commercial AdvertiserDaily GraphicEast Village OtherEast Village EyeFreedom's JournalThe FreemanFreie Arbeiter Stimme (Yiddish-language)Der Groyser Kundes (Yiddish-language weekly)Il Progresso Italo-Americano (Italian-language daily)Long Island Press (original daily) Ming Pao Daily News (free Chinese-language daily)National Guardian (weekly)New York AceNew York Age / New York Age DefenderNew York AvatarThe New York Blade (weekly)New York City Tribune (daily)New York ClipperNew York Courier and EnquirerNew York Daily MirrorNew York Daily News (19th century)New York DispatchNew York Enquirer (twice weekly)New York Evening ExpressNew York Evening MailNew York Evening TelegramThe New York Globe (two newspapers)New York GraphicNew York Guardian (monthly)New York Herald (daily)New York Herald Tribune (daily)New York IndependentNew York Journal-American (daily)New-York MirrorNew York Native (bi-weekly)New York NewsdayNew York ReportNew York Press (historical)The New York Sporting WhipNew York Sports ExpressThe New York Sun (daily)New-York Tribune (daily)New York WorldNew York World Journal TribuneNew York World-TelegramNew Yorker Staatszeitung (German-language weekly)The Onion (free weekly)Other ScenesPMRat Subterranean NewsSpirit of the TimesStaten Island RegisterThe SunThe Village Voice (free weekly)

Magazines
Magazines with a primary focus on (parts or surroundings of) New York City
 Billboard Bloomberg Businessweek Brooklyn Magazine The Brooklyn Rail City Limits Cosmopolitan Entertainment Weekly GO NYC Harper's Bazaar The L Magazine L'Idea Manhattan, inc. (defunct)
 New York The New Yorker Next Magazine Rolling Stone Seventeen The Real Deal Time Out NY Time VogueDefunct magazines
 Hello Mr. (biannual)

Magazines published in New York
New York is not necessarily a focus of these magazines.
 Condé Nast Publications magazines
 Jacobin (quarterly)
 n+1 (triannual)
 The New York Review of Books (biweekly)
 OnEarth Magazine (quarterly publication of NRDC)
 Vice (magazine published in New York)
 Reader's Digest (publishes 10 times annually)
 Good Housekeeping (publishes 10 times annually)
 People (weekly)
 Woman's Day'' (publishes 10 times annually)

See also
 Media in New York City
 List of newspapers in New York (state)

References

New York City-related lists